Super Idol was the first Greek version of the British television hit show Pop Idol. It was a talent contest to find a pop performer. The first series of the show, from February 8 to June 17, 2004, was hosted by Themis Georgantas and the winner was Stavros Konstantinou.

Due to low ratings Mega Channel has decided to cancel after only one season, however Georgian runner-up Tamta Goduadze achieved major success and established herself in the Greek music industry afterwards. The panel of judges for the first season of the show were Elena Katrava, Kostantis Spyropoulos and Ilias Psinakis.

Auditions
The show started in 2004 and auditions were held at three locations: Cyprus, Thessalonica and finally Athens. The winner, Stavros, was from Cyprus. Runner up Tamta Goduadze also recorded the duet T'allo Mou Miso with Stavros on his first CD.

Semi-finals
Top 50
Format: 2 out of 10 making in each week

Finals

Finalists
(ages stated at time of contest)

See also
Greek Idol

 
Mega Channel original programming
Greek-language television shows
Greek reality television series
Greek music television series
2004 Greek television series debuts
2004 Greek television series endings
2000s Greek television series
Television series by Fremantle (company)
Greek television series based on British television series